Rohel Briceño (born 15 March 1984) is a Venezuelan international footballer who plays for Trujillanos, as a defender.

Club career
Briceño has played for Zamora FC and Caracas FC.

International career
He made his international debut for Venezuela in 2011.

References

1984 births
People from Barinas (state)
Living people
Venezuelan footballers
Venezuela international footballers
Zamora FC players
Caracas FC players
Aragua FC players
Association football defenders
21st-century Venezuelan people